Frédéric Cicchirillo (born 26 September 1972) is a retired French football striker. He became Luxembourg National Division top goalscorer in 1998–99 and 2001–02, and awarded Luxembourgish Footballer of the Year in 2002. Before that he got two Ligue 2 seasons with SAS Épinal.

References

1972 births
Living people
French footballers
FC Metz players
SAS Épinal players
US Raon-l'Étape players
F91 Dudelange players
Association football forwards
Ligue 2 players
French expatriate footballers
Expatriate footballers in Luxembourg
French expatriate sportspeople in Luxembourg